San Uk Ling is a village in Man Kam To, North District, Hong Kong.

Administration
San Uk Ling is a recognized village under the New Territories Small House Policy. It is one of the villages represented within the Ta Kwu Ling District Rural Committee. For electoral purposes, San Uk Ling is part of the Sha Ta constituency, which is currently represented by Ko Wai-kei.

See also
 San Uk Ling Holding Centre

References

Villages in North District, Hong Kong